Laurent Emmanuelli, (born 19 September 1976 in Toulon) is a French rugby union player who plays as a prop for Top 14 side RC Toulon. He has previously played for Stade Montois, Clermont Auvergne and Stade Français.

He won the 2006–07 European Challenge Cup and played in the final against Bath, his performance got him onto the stand-by list for the French squad in the 2007 Rugby World Cup.

Honours
 Finalist of Top 14 : 2007
 Winner of European Challenge Cup : 2007

External links and Stats
 lequipe profile
 its rugby profile

References

1976 births
French rugby union players
Living people
Rugby union props
ASM Clermont Auvergne players
Stade Français players
RC Toulonnais players
French people of Corsican descent